Eudonia cataxesta is a moth in the family Crambidae. It was described by Edward Meyrick in 1884. It is endemic to New Zealand.

Description 

The wingspan is 23–27 mm. The forewings are dark slaty-grey, with an indigo-bluish tinge and with fine scattered grey-whitish scales. The hindwings are whitish-grey with a darker grey hindmarginal band. Adults have been recorded on wing in January and February.

Host species 
The caterpillars of this species are associated with mosses. Adult moths probably feed on the flowers of Helichrysum intermedium.

References

Moths described in 1884
Eudonia
Moths of New Zealand
Endemic fauna of New Zealand
Taxa named by Edward Meyrick
Endemic moths of New Zealand